Tunica Elementary School may refer to:
 Tunica Elementary School - Tunica, Mississippi - Tunica County School District
 Tunica Elementary School - West Feliciana Parish, Louisiana - West Feliciana Parish Public Schools